The International Culinary Center was a private for-profit culinary school headquartered in New York City. In 2020, it merged into the Institute of Culinary Education, also in New York City.  It was founded as The French Culinary Institute by Dorothy Cann Hamilton in 1984 and has campuses in New York City and the San Francisco Bay Area. The facilities include professional kitchens for hands-on cooking and baking classes, specialized wine tasting classrooms, a library, theater, and event spaces.

Locations

New York City campus
This location includes L'Ecole restaurant on the ground floor and features fare from culinary program students, as well as a Culinary Theater that hosts events, forums, and lectures from graduates. The International Culinary Center is also home to FCI Catering & Events, which creates and caters both on and off-premises private events.

California campus
Opened in 2011, the center's California location is in Campbell, in the San Francisco Bay Area. The facilities consist of kitchens, a library, theaters, an event space and a wine tasting room, which hosts a sommelier training course. The facility is the former location of another culinary school, the Professional Culinary Institute.  This location closed in 2018.

Reception
In 1984 when the school first opened, it was visited by chef Julia Child, who reportedly arranged to have the school profiled on Good Morning America one week later.

Notable alumni 

Antonia Lofaso
Dan Barber
David Chang
Wylie Dufresne
Bobby Flay, alumnus of the 1st class in 1984
Travis London
 Chris Morocco
 Carla Lalli Music
 Christina Tosi
 Lara Trump
 Kate Williams
 Lee Anne Wong
Gilat Bennett

References

External links
 

Universities and colleges in Manhattan
Cooking schools in the United States
Culinary arts
Sommeliers